Lady Elizabeth Basset, DCVO (née Legge; 5 March 1908 – 30 November 2000), was an English author and courtier.

Biography 
Basset was born at 8 Prince's Gate, Knightsbridge, the second daughter of the 7th Earl of Dartmouth and Lady Ruperta Wynn-Carrington, daughter of the Marquess of Lincolnshire. She was educated at home.

On 31 October 1931, she married Ronald Lambert Basset (1898–1972), senior representative of the ancient Basset family of Tehidy in Cornwall. They had two children, industrialist Bryan Ronald Basset  (1932–2010) and Peter Francis Basset (1935–1954). During the Second World War, she ran a small farm in North Devon.

In 1959, Queen Elizabeth, the Queen Mother, asked  Basset to be a Woman of the Bedchamber. She held that position until 1981. She was active as a Lady-in-Waiting from 1982 to 1993. She retired at the age of 85.

She was appointed a Commander of the Royal Victorian Order in 1976 and a dame of the same order in 1989.

Lady Elizabeth authored a devotional book, Love Is My Meaning, and four anthologies.

Lady Elizabeth Basset died in London in 2000, aged 92.

Bibliography
 Love is My Meaning - An Anthology of Assurance (1973)
 Each in His Prison (1978)
 The Bridge is Love: an anthology of hope (1981)
 Interpreted by Love: an anthology of praise (1994)
 Beyond the Blue Mountains: Wisdom and Compassion on Living and Dying (1999)

References

1908 births
2000 deaths
Dames Commander of the Royal Victorian Order
Daughters of British earls
Ladies of the Bedchamber
People from Knightsbridge
British religious writers
20th-century British women writers
20th-century British writers